Daria Bujnicka (born 11 December 2003) is a Polish para badminton player who competes in international level events.

She trains alongside Oliwia Szmigiel and they compete together in doubles events, they won a bronze medal at the 2019 BWF Para-Badminton World Championships in Basel, Switzerland.

Achievements

World Championships 
Women's doubles

Mixed doubles

European Championships 
Women's doubles

References

Notes 

2003 births
Living people
Sportspeople from Łódź
Polish female badminton players
Polish para-badminton players